Gennady Mikhailovich Manakov (1 June 1950 – 26 September 2019) was a Soviet and Russian cosmonaut who commanded two Soyuz flights to the Mir space station.

He was born in Yefimovka, Chkalov Oblast, Russian SFSR, on 1 June 1950. He was selected on 2 September 1985 and flew as Commander on Soyuz TM-10 and Soyuz TM-16, before retiring on 20 December 1996. He was married with two children. He died on 26 September 2019 according to a statement from his friend, Cosmonaut Maksim Surayev.

Awards 
 Hero of the Soviet Union
 Pilot-Cosmonaut of the USSR
 Order of Military Merit
 Order of Lenin
 Order of Friendship of Peoples
 Medal "For Merit in Space Exploration"
 Officer of the Legion of Honour (France)

References

1950 births
2019 deaths
People from Orenburg Oblast
Moscow Aviation Institute alumni
Heroes of the Soviet Union
Officiers of the Légion d'honneur
Recipients of the Medal "For Merit in Space Exploration"
Recipients of the Order of Friendship of Peoples
Recipients of the Order of Lenin
Recipients of the Order of Military Merit (Russia)
Russian cosmonauts
Soviet Air Force officers
Soviet cosmonauts
Spacewalkers
Mir crew members
Burials at the Federal Military Memorial Cemetery